Andi Depu (born August 1, 1907 - June 18, 1985) was an Indonesian revolutionary. Under her leadership, Dutch invaders were expelled from Mandar. She was the first female high king or Maharajah in Indonesia.

Early life
Depu was born on August 1, 1907 in Tinambung, Polewali Mandar. She was a royal child of the 50th king of Balanipa, Laqju Kanna Idoro. As a child, Depu enjoyed climbing trees, riding horses and playing war games. She was also sociable and enjoyed hanging out with different people in Mandar.

Revolution
In 1923, Andi Depu married Andi Baso Pabiseang. Her married life eventually turned strained because of their contradicting beliefs — she was willing to defend the land from conquerors, while her husband was in favor of the Dutch occupation— leading to their divorce. Depu and her son, Andi Parenrengi, joined the movement against the Dutch East Indies Government. Depu did not raise much suspicion as a combatant due to her gender. In 1939, Depu was crowned as ruler of Balanipa.

When the Japanese overthrew the Dutch, Depu led the establishment of Fujinkai in Mandar to tackle the struggles of women in the region. She actively supported the youth organization Jong Islameiten Bond.

In 1945, Depu founded and led the Kris Muda (Islamic Secret Awakening), with the goal of defending Indonesia's independence. The movement expanded to a number of places outside Mandar.

When the Dutch came back to Indonesia after Japanese colonization, Depu made the Balanipa Palace the headquarters of republican fighters in Mandar. Under her leadership, she was able to defend Mandar from Dutch invasion.
The Dutch army once saw the Indonesian flag raised on a small pole in front of her house and demanded to lower it, but Depu grabbed the flag and waved it in front of them as a sign of resistance.

The Dutch, however, were eventually able to capture Depu. In December 1949, she was arrested by the Netherlands Indies Civil Administration and was heavily tortured. She was later released.

Death
Depu died on June 18, 1985 in Makassar. She is buried at the Panaikang Heroes Cemetery in Sulawesi.

References

1907 births
1985 deaths
Women in war in Indonesia
Women soldiers
Indonesian women